Bir Puadh is a village in the tehsil of Phagwara, Kapurthala district, in Punjab, India.

Demographics
According to the 2001 Census, Bir Puadh has a population of 379 people. Neighbouring villages include Bhulla Rai, Akarlgarh, Dhak Khalwara and Khalwara.

History
According to local tradition, Bir Puadh was first settled by the Atwal families, hailing from Pharala, in Nawanshahr district. Accordingly, the Atwal Jathera is in Pharala.

References

Villages in Kapurthala district